Uladzimir Mikalayevich Vostrykaw (Vladimir Nikolayevich Ostrikov; born 21 February 1976) is a Belarusian football coach and a former player.

Honours
Dinamo Minsk
Belarusian Premier League champion: 1993–94, 1994–95, 1995
Belarusian Cup winner: 1993–94

Belshina Bobruisk
Belarusian Premier League champion: 2001
Belarusian Cup winner: 2000–01

References

1976 births
Living people
Belarusian footballers
Association football midfielders
Belarusian expatriate footballers
Expatriate footballers in Russia
Russian Premier League players
FC Dinamo Minsk players
FC Chernomorets Novorossiysk players
FC Belshina Bobruisk players
FC Tom Tomsk players
FC Torpedo Minsk players
FC Vitebsk players
FC SKVICH Minsk players
FC Energetik-BGU Minsk players